Marginella gemma is a species of small colorful sea snail, a marine gastropod mollusk in the family Marginellidae.

This species is endemic to São Tomé and Príncipe.

References

gemma
Endemic fauna of São Tomé and Príncipe
Invertebrates of São Tomé and Príncipe
Gastropods described in 1850
Taxonomy articles created by Polbot